Trusina may refer to the following places:

 Trusina (Konjic), village in the municipality of Konjic, Bosnia and Herzegovina
 Trusina, Nevesinje, village in the municipality of Nevesinje, Bosnia and Herzegovina
 Trusina, Berkovići, a village in the municipality of Berkovići, Bosnia and Herzegovina